Sarai Givaty-Luboschits is an Israeli actress, singer-songwriter, and model As a musician, she is also known by her stage name ESH.

Early life
Born Sarai Givaty (or Givati) in Tiberias, Israel, to a family of Sephardic Jewish (Iraqi-Jewish and Moroccan-Jewish) descent. Her parents are Edna (née Elkayam) and Eliyahu Givaty. She has two sisters, one of whom is married to Israeli actor Guy Arieli. Givaty moved to the U.S. after her high school graduation.

She claims that she was discharged from the Israel Defense Forces after several days of military service, because of severe allergies to dust.

Career 
Givaty's first role was in a live sketch on the Israeli tonight show (Kol Layla) where she played an American reporter. The segment was very successful. On the final show, Israeli hush critic Raana Shacked called it "the pick of the show". Givaty continued shooting the segment even after she moved to New York City where she attended acting school at the HB Studios.

In 2005 Givaty was a part of a small group of well-known young adult television hosts who received the "Best Teen Show of The Year" from the Israel Golden Screen Award (Masah Hazahav) for hosting the show Exit on Arutz 10. Shortly thereafter, Givaty became a big name in the Israeli entertainment industry and received many large company endorsements.

A year later Givaty decided to explore her work options in Los Angeles. Upon her arrival, she quickly landed the lead role in a film called The Passage starring opposite Stephen Dorff. In 2007, the movie premiered at the Toronto International Film Festival where critics called Givaty's performance "star making".

Another notable project she has worked on was the lead in the Enrique Iglesias video "Somebody's Me".

In 2008, she played a Russian spy in the pilot episode of My Own Worst Enemy next to Christian Slater. In 2009, she was back in Israel to shoot yet another comedic role in TV series called The Pilot Wives.

In 2010, it was announced that Givaty would portray Mossad Officer Liat Tuvia for two episodes in the eighth season of NCIS. Then-executive producer Shane Brennan elaborated on the character's role in the story arc, saying that Liat's presence would leave series regular Ziva (Cote de Pablo), a former Mossad agent, feeling replaced "personally and professionally". In an interview after the first episode aired, Givaty commented, "Let's just say, Liat is a good guy at the end of the day. It's just that her ways are different. Like, she doesn't say 'Drop your weapon' before she shoots a terrorist. She just shoots him and says 'Drop your weapon'...So, yeah, she has her way, but at the end of the day, she's a good guy."

Givaty also plays piano and guitar in a band and has been playing concerts in both Israel and Los Angeles.

In 2014, she appeared in The Expendables 3 alongside Mel Gibson and Robert Davi.

In 2017, she co-starred in the romantic thriller film Body of Deceit, alongside Kristanna Loken.

Personal life 
Givaty married Israeli businessman Or Luboschits on September 5, 2014. In 2015, they had a baby son, Riff. In March 2018, she had her daughter, Kai. The four reside in Tel Aviv, Israel.

Filmography

References

External links

 
 
 Sarai Givaty Official MySpace 
 Sarai Givaty Official Site Art 

Israeli film actresses
21st-century Israeli women singers
Israeli emigrants to the United States
1982 births
Living people
People from Tiberias
Israeli female models
Israeli women television presenters
Israeli women singer-songwriters
Israeli Sephardi Jews
Israeli people of Iraqi-Jewish descent
Israeli people of Moroccan-Jewish descent
Israeli Mizrahi Jews